Frederick Talbot (18 September 1908 – ?) was a Welsh professional rugby league footballer who played in the 1930s.

Playing career

1933
Talbot played right- in Huddersfield's 21–17 victory over Warrington in the 1932–33 Challenge Cup final at Wembley Stadium, London on Saturday 6 May 1933.

1935
Talbot was a "reserve to travel" for Wales while at Huddersfield in the 11-18 defeat by France during the 1935 European Rugby League Championship at Stade du Parc Lescure, Bordeaux on Tuesday 1 January 1935, and won a cap in the 11-24 defeat by England at Anfield, Liverpool on Wednesday 10 April 1935.

1937
He and played right second row in Keighley's 5-18 defeat by Widnes in the 1936–37 Challenge Cup final  at Wembley on Saturday 8 May 1937, in front of a crowd of 47,699.

References

1908 births
Huddersfield Giants players
Keighley Cougars players
Rugby league locks
Rugby league players from Ebbw Vale
Rugby league second-rows
Wales national rugby league team players
Welsh rugby league players
Year of death missing